Rovérsio Rodrigues de Barros (born 17 January 1984), known simply as Rovérsio, is a Brazilian former professional footballer who played as a central defender.

Football career
Born in Igarassu, Pernambuco, Rovérsio started playing with Santa Cruz Futebol Clube, moving abroad in the 2004–05 season to Portugal's Gil Vicente F.C. and making his Primeira Liga debut on 28 August 2004 in a 2–3 away loss against Sporting Clube de Portugal. During three years (the last spent in the second division), he was an important defensive element.

In 2007, Rovérsio signed a one-year contract with F.C. Paços de Ferreira, moving the following campaign to La Liga club CA Osasuna. On 13 November 2008, he suffered a serious knee injury in a Copa del Rey game against Getafe CF, which rendered him unavailable for nearly one year.

After recovering, Rovérsio was only the fourth-choice stopper, and appeared in just three games in the league season, one of those coming on 2 May 2010 in a 2–3 loss at Real Madrid. In late August, he was loaned to Real Betis in Segunda División, with the Andalusians having an option to make the move permanent at the end of the campaign for about €1.6 million.

Rovérsio returned to Osasuna for 2011–12, initially being made first-choice by manager José Luis Mendilibar. On 17 September 2011, he scored in his own net in a 0–8 away loss against FC Barcelona.

Rovérsio spent the 2012–13 season in Turkey with Orduspor. On 19 July 2013, the New York Cosmos announced they had agreed terms with the 29-year-old. He made his debut for the latter on 17 August against the Carolina RailHawks, and was a key contributor to a team that won the Soccer Bowl 2013, conceding only 12 goals in the process, a competition best; he was also named to the North American Soccer League Team of the Week twice.

During the 2014 Spring season, Rovérsio appeared in eight of nine games and helped anchor the center of a Cosmos defense that allowed just three goals in nine games, setting a modern NASL day record for minutes without conceding at 372. He battled a knee injury during the fall season, but made the NASL Team of the Week in round 14 for his performance in a 2–1 win against Ottawa Fury FC.

References

External links
Cosmos official profile

1984 births
Living people
Sportspeople from Pernambuco
Brazilian footballers
Association football defenders
Santa Cruz Futebol Clube players
Primeira Liga players
Liga Portugal 2 players
Gil Vicente F.C. players
F.C. Paços de Ferreira players
La Liga players
Segunda División players
CA Osasuna players
Real Betis players
Süper Lig players
Orduspor footballers
North American Soccer League players
New York Cosmos (2010) players
Brazilian expatriate footballers
Expatriate footballers in Portugal
Expatriate footballers in Spain
Expatriate footballers in Turkey
Expatriate soccer players in the United States
Brazilian expatriate sportspeople in Portugal
Brazilian expatriate sportspeople in Spain
Brazilian expatriate sportspeople in the United States